The Shot was a basketball play by Michael Jordan during Game 5 of the 1989 NBA Eastern Conference First Round.

The Shot may also refer to:

Basketball
The Shot (Duke–Kentucky), by Christian Laettner of Duke during the Elite Eight of the 1992 NCAA Tournament against Kentucky
The Shot (Valparaiso University), by Bryce Drew of Valparaiso during the first round of the 1998 NCAA Tournament against Mississippi

Television
The Shot (TV series), an American reality competition show
"The Shot" (BoJack Horseman), a television episode
"The Shot" (Rugrats), a television episode

Other uses
"The Shot" (Pushkin), an 1831 short story by Aleksandr Pushkin
The Shot (1969 film), a 1969 Swedish film
The Shot, a 2003 short film by Puven Pather
The Shot, backing group for Graham Parker on his 1985 album Steady Nerves

See also
Shot (disambiguation)
Shot heard round the world, a phrase referring to several historical incidents
Shoot (disambiguation)